Jannis is a given name. Notable people with the name include:

Jannis Bäcker (born 1985), German bobsledder
Jannis Kallinikos (born 1954), Greek academic
Jannis Kounellis (born 1936), Greek artist
Jannis Niewöhner (born 1992), German actor
Jannis Schliesing (born 1992), German footballer
Jannis Zamanduridis (born 1966), German sport wrestler
Jannis Zotos (born 1958), German musician

See also
Janni